Chotipat Poomkaew (born May 28, 1998) is a Thai professional footballer who plays as a winger for Thai League 1 club Chiangrai United.

Honours

Club
Chiangrai United
 Thai FA Cup: 2020–21
 Thailand Champions Cup: 2020

International
Thailand U-19
 AFF U-19 Youth Championship: 2015

References

External links

1998 births
Living people
Chotipat Poomkaew
Chotipat Poomkaew
Association football defenders
Association football wingers
Chotipat Poomkaew
Chotipat Poomkaew
Chotipat Poomkaew
Chotipat Poomkaew
Chotipat Poomkaew